Riello is a municipality located in the province of León, Castile and León, Spain. According to the 2004 census (INE), the municipality has a population of 864 inhabitants.

other
riello ups is a multinational company its headquarter located in Viale Europa, 7 ZAI, 37045 Legnago (VR), and In India it is in Plot no. 213A, Sector-4, IMT Manesar, 122050 Gurgaon (HR).

References

Municipalities in the Province of León